Charles William Miller (June 2, 1939 – June 4, 1980) was an American musician best known as the saxophonist and flutist for multicultural California funk band War. Notably, Miller provided lead vocals as well as sax on the band's Billboard R&B #1 hit "Low Rider" (1975).

Biography
Miller was born in Olathe, Kansas, moved with his family to Los Angeles two years later, and settled in Long Beach, California. His father was a musician who featured with organist Paul Bryant.

Charles was always interested in music, which included his playing of woodwinds, piano, and guitar, as well as with school bands and school orchestras.

In 1967, Charles' interest in music was secondary to football until, when at Long Beach City College, he sustained a football injury.

Charles recorded with various groups such as Señor Soul on Señor Soul Plays Funky Favorites (1968), and It's Your Thing (1969), both on Double Shot Records. He participated in recording sessions with The Ray Charles Band, and toured with the Debonaires, Brenton Wood, Señor Soul and Afro Blues Quintet + 1.

In the summer of 1969, Charles was in Hollywood at the first Studio Instrument Rentals (located on Santa Monica and Vine) when he heard Harold Brown practicing with Howard E. Scott and Papa Dee Allen. He joined and the Night Shift was created.

Charles Miller was performing at the Rag Doll in North Hollywood with the Night Shift when Eric Burdon and Lee Oskar came into the club. Lee Oskar went to the bandstand and that’s when their distinct sound came together, the blend of his saxophone and Lee Oskar's harmonica.

Charles Miller’s deep voice is heard on the War song "Low Rider", and he is credited by many sources as the dominant and initial songwriter of "Low Rider". It was recorded at Wally Heider Studios in San Francisco in 1975 and has been sampled by many artists like Flo Rida (who used it for his song "G.D.F.R."), and is heard in movies such as Up in Smoke, Beverly Hills Chihuahua and television shows, being the theme song for the sitcom George Lopez.

Death
In 1980, Charles Miller was stabbed to death in Los Angeles during a botched street robbery. To this day, no one has been arrested or prosecuted for his murder. At the time of his death, he was living in Hollywood with his wife, Eddy Miller, daughters, Annette and Laurian, and his sons, Donald and Mark. He also had a son with another woman, Joseph Charles Newton.

See also
 List of unsolved murders (1980-1999)

References

Link to Legacy.com wrong Charles Miller
https://www.legacy.com/obituaries/name/charles-miller-obituary?pid=001101757&affiliateid=494

External links
 allmusic
 themusicsover
 war reference

1939 births
1980 deaths
20th-century American musicians
20th-century saxophonists
African-American saxophonists
American funk saxophonists
American male saxophonists
American murder victims
Male murder victims
Murdered African-American people
Musicians from California
People from Olathe, Kansas
People murdered in Los Angeles
Unsolved murders in the United States
War (American band) members
20th-century American male musicians
1980 murders in the United States
Deaths by stabbing in California